Starosel Gate (Staroselska Porta \sta-ro-'sel-ska 'por-ta\) is a 150-m wide pass of elevation 500 m situated between St. Naum Peak and the north extremity of Balchik Ridge in Levski Ridge, Tangra Mountains on Livingston Island, Antarctica.  Providing overland access from Boyana Glacier to upper Macy Glacier.  Bulgarian topographic survey Tangra 2004/05.  Named after the settlement of Starosel in central Bulgaria.

Maps
 L.L. Ivanov et al. Antarctica: Livingston Island and Greenwich Island, South Shetland Islands. Scale 1:100000 topographic map. Sofia: Antarctic Place-names Commission of Bulgaria, 2005.
 L.L. Ivanov. Antarctica: Livingston Island and Greenwich, Robert, Snow and Smith Islands. Scale 1:120000 topographic map.  Troyan: Manfred Wörner Foundation, 2009.

References
 Starosel Gate. SCAR Composite Gazetteer of Antarctica
 Bulgarian Antarctic Gazetteer. Antarctic Place-names Commission. (details in Bulgarian, basic data in English)

External links
 Starosel Gate. Copernix satellite image

Mountain passes of Livingston Island
Bulgaria and the Antarctic